Shenzhou 15 is a Chinese spaceflight that launched on 29 November 2022, at 15:08 UTC. The flight marked the tenth crewed Chinese spaceflight and the fifteenth flight of the Shenzhou program. The spacecraft carried three People's Liberation Army Astronaut Corps (PLAAC) taikonauts on the fourth flight to the Tianhe core module, the first module of the Tiangong space station. The launch of the three-person crew with a Long March 2F launch vehicle took place from the Jiuquan Satellite Launch Center.

Background 
The spaceflight is the third Chinese mission set to last six months (180 days). The flight marked the fourth crewed mission to dock with the Tiangong space station before the end of 2022.

Mission 
The mission visited the Tianhe core module following the launch and docking of Tianzhou 5, the fourth resupply mission to the station. In addition, it also marked the first Chinese crew handover and created a record of 6 taikonauts in space at the same time with Shenzhou 14. The mission was launched following the launch and docking of the Wentian and Mengtian modules, in July and October 2022, respectively. There was a 5-day overlap between Shenzhou 15 and the previous Shenzhou mission, Shenzhou 14.

The crew were greeted by the Shenzhou 14 crew while entering the Tianhe core module later on 29 November 2022, at 23:33 UTC as the fourth expedition to the Tiangong space station.
 
The Shenzhou 15 crew is expected to carry out 3 to 4 spacewalks, work on payloads both inside and outside the station, and carry out other scientific work during the 6-month mission.

In preparation for the mission, Shenzhou 16 was prepped and ready on standby as an emergency rescue mission in case any serious problems were to happen to the Shenzhou 15 mission.

Spacewalks 
On 9 February 2023, the first scheduled spacewalk of Shenzhou 15 was carried out by Fei Junlong and Zhang Lu through the airlock of the Wentian lab module, with Deng Qingming assisting the pair from inside the Tianhe core module. Fei and Zhang completed a series of tasks, including installing an external pump on the Mengtian lab module and other tasks related to Mengtian's payload airlock, which allows astronauts to deploy science payloads and small satellites using the station's robotic arms. The spacewalk lasted for 7 hours and 6 minutes, making it China's longest to date.

In early March, the second planned spacewalk of Shenzhou 15 was conducted by Fei Junlong and Zhang Lu through the airlock of the Wentian lab module, with Deng Qingming assisting the pair from inside the Tianhe core module. The two spacewalkers completed all the scheduled tasks and returned safely to the Wentian lab module. No specified tasks, time period or other details were stated.

Spacecraft 

The Shenzhou 15 spacecraft is based on the Soyuz MS design concept. Shenzhou was approved in 1992 as part of the Chinese space program Project 921, and has a design similar to the Russian Soyuz spacecraft.

In the front of the spacecraft, there is the orbital module which contains an androgynous docking ring based on APAS technology, which is used to dock with the Tianhe core module. In the middle is the reentry module containing the crew which is a scaled-up version of the Soyuz descent module. The rear of the spacecraft is the service module which is equipped with engines, fuel tanks, and solar panels.

Crew 
The crew was publicly announced in a press conference on 28 November 2022.

See also 

 Shenzhou (spacecraft)
 Tiangong space station
 China National Space Administration

References 

2022 in China
Spacecraft launched in 2022
Human spaceflights
Shenzhou program
Tiangong program